Udupi Power Plant is a coal based thermal power station in Karnataka, India, established in 2008.

The power station caused controversy as it was built within Kudremukh National Park and caused protests.

Installed capacity

It has installed capacity of 1200 MW (2x600). The plant became fully operational in September 2012.

The plant is operated by Udupi Power Corporation Limited which is a subsidiary of Lanco Infratech. Earlier the plant was owned by Nagarjuna Power Corporation Limited.

In August 2014, Lanco Infratech has agreed to sell this power plant to Adani Power for Rupees 6,000 Crores. The deal finally concluded in April, 2015.

Adani power proposed phase 2 at the same site for 2x800MW and received environment clearance from MoEF

References

External links
 Land requirement

Coal-fired power stations in Karnataka
Energy infrastructure completed in 2008
Buildings and structures in Udupi district
2008 establishments in Karnataka